Jonathan Ezequiel Guerazar (born 26 March 1990) is an Argentine professional footballer who plays as a midfielder.

External links
 

1990 births
Living people
Argentine footballers
Association football midfielders
Unión de Mar del Plata footballers
Oriente Petrolero players
Unión San Felipe footballers
Ñublense footballers
Argentine expatriate footballers
Argentine expatriate sportspeople in Chile
Expatriate footballers in Chile
Argentine expatriate sportspeople in Bolivia
Expatriate footballers in Bolivia
Footballers from Buenos Aires